Queimados is a municipality located in the Brazilian state of Rio de Janeiro. Its population was 151,335 (2020) and its area is 75 km². The city is divided into 37 districts.

Politics

Mayors 
1993 - 1996 - Jorge Cesar Pereira da Cunha
1997 - 2000 - Azair Ramos da Silva
2001 - 2004 - Azair Ramos da Silva
2005 - 2008 - Carlos Rogério dos Santos - "Roger Hall"
2009 - 2012 - Max Lemos
2013 - 2016 - Max Lemos

Presidents of the Chamber of Aldermen
1993 - 1996 - Albino Carlos Pires de Andrade
1997 - 2000 - Milton Antonio Campos
2001 - 2004 - Max Lemos Rodrigues
2005 - 2008 - Milton Antonio Campos
2009 - current - Milton Antonio Campos

Alderman 
1993 - 1996
Azair Ramos da Silva
Albino Carlos Pires de Andrade
Geraldo Ramos da Costa - "Geraldão"
Gilberto de Oliveira Peres - "Gil's Glory"
Jorge dos Santos Nascimento
José Alves de Carvalho - "Dequinha"
Jose Carlos Nunes de Paula - "Zé Carlos"
Milton Antonio Campos
Pedro Pereira Portes

1997 - 2000
Adir Antonio Loredo - "Didi Loredo"
Carlos Rogério dos Santos - "Roger Hall"
Delson de Oliveira Matos
Galba Tavares
Geraldo Ramos da Costa - "Geraldão"
Gilberto de Oliveira Peres - "Gil's Glory"
José Alves de Carvalho - "Dequinha"
Jose Bittencourt Filho - "Zuzinha"
Jose Carlos Nunes de Paula - "Zé Carlos"
Jose Dantas - "Pastor Dantas"
Luciano Luis Moreyra - "Luciano Gomes"
Manoel Soares Belchior
Milton Antonio Campos
Moacir Algusto
Hosea Moreira dos Santos

Substitutes 
Itamar Rose Rodrigues
Geraldo Dias da Silva
Pedro Pereira Portes
Leda Ferreira da Silva Gonçalves

2001 - 2004
Adir Antonio Loredo - "Didi Loredo"
Carlos Roberto de Moraes - "Bald"
Carlos Rogério dos Santos - "Roger Hall"
Delso de Oliveira Matos
Ismael Lopes de Oliveira
Jairo da Costa Lima - "Jairinho"
Jose Carlos Nunes de Paula - "Zé Carlos"
Luciano Luiz Moreira - "Luciano Gomes"
Max Lemos Rodrigues
Milton Antonio Campos
Neli Nery Fraga da Silva - "Lica São Roque"
Ozéias Moreira dos Santos
Paulo Bernardo da Silva - "Paul Witch"
Paulo Roberto da Silva - "Pastor Paulinho"
Sampaio Wilson - "Wilson's Three Fountains"

Substitutes 
Moacir Augusto
Jose Dantas - "Pastor Dantas"
Robson de Souza Silva

2005 - 2008
Adir Antonio Loredo - "Didi Loredo"
Carlos Roberto de Moraes - "Bald"
Gilmar Ferreira de Novais - "Gil São Roque"
Jefferson Dias da Silva
John the Baptist Scoponi
José Alves de Carvalho - "Dequinha"
Milton Antonio Campos
Nilton Moreira Cavalcanti
Paulo César Pires de Andrade - "Paulinho See Everything"
Robson Chedid - "Conspiracy of Binho"
Robson de Souza Silva

2009 - 2012
Carlos Machado de Oliveira - "Axe"
Carlos Roberto de Moraes - "Bald"
Sender Carlos dos Santos - "Carlão Water is Life"
David Brazil Caetano - "David Brazil"
Elton Teixeira da Silva Rosa
Jairo da Costa Lima - "Jairinho"
Jefferson Dias da Silva
Julio Alves Goes - "Dr Julius Goes"
Milton Antonio Campos - "Milton Fields"
Paulo César Pires de Andrade - "Paulinho See Everything"
Sampaio Wilson - "Wilson's Three Fountains"

Substitutes 
Robson Chedid - "Conspiracy of Binho"
Fatima Cristina Dias Sanches - "Dr Fatima"

2012 - 2016
Fatima Cristina Dias Sanches - "Dr Fatima"
Sampaio Wilson - "Wilson's Three Fountains"
Carlos Roberto de Moraes - "Bald"
Lucio Mauro Lima Castro - "Lucio Mauro"
Elton Teixeira Rosa da Silva - "Elton Teixeira"
Getulio de Moura - "Getulio tutu"
Elerson Leandro Alves - "Elerson"
Antonio Almeida Silva - "Anthony Almeida"
Paulo César Pires de Andrade - "Paulinho See Everything"
Milton Antonio Campos - "Milton Fields"
Nilton Moreira Cavalcanti - "Professor Nilton Moreira"
Adriano Morie - "Morie"
Leandro Silveira War - "War Léo"

Substitutes 
Carlos Machado de Oliveira - "Machado Laz"
MARCOS ALVES VALÉRIO ROSA - "MARQUINHO massive package"
José Alves de Carvalho - "Dequinha"
Martchellos de Almeida Parreiras Fuli - "Martchello"
Chrispe Antonio de Oliveira - "Tuninho Vira Virou"
Marcelo Leyed Miranda - "Marcelo Picciani"
Marcelo de Jesus Teixeira Lessa - "Marcelo Lessa"

Infrastructure

Transportation 
Queimados has two bus companies that make municipal paths: Gardel Fazeni Tourism and Transport and Tourism; Five Companies make Intermunicipal Paths: Linave Transport, Transport Blanco, Gardel Tourism, Transport and Tourism and Fazeni Nilopolitana Cavalcanti and Co. A Train Station Meets Extension of Japeri SuperVia, Burnley Station
References

References

Municipalities in Rio de Janeiro (state)